The 2007 Masters Tournament was the 71st Masters Tournament, held April 5–8 at Augusta National Golf Club in Augusta, Georgia. Zach Johnson won his first major championship, two strokes ahead of runners-up Retief Goosen, Rory Sabbatini, and Tiger Woods. Cool temperatures and gusty winds on the weekend resulted in high scores for the field; Johnson's 289 (+1) tied for the highest winning score ever.

Johnson's victory dispelled the notion that only long-hitters could win the Masters. He did not reach a single par five hole in two during the entire tournament, yet played the par fives better than anyone in the field with 11 birdies and no bogeys.

This was the final Masters appearance for two-time champion Seve Ballesteros.

Course

Field
The Masters has the smallest field of the four major championships; only 97 players were invited to compete in the 2007 tournament. Officially, the Masters remains an invitational event, despite its qualification process. In theory, the club could decline to invite a 'qualified' player.

There were a record 50 'international' players in the field - the first time that the majority of the field was not American. The entire field is shown below; each player is classified according to the first category by which he qualified, but other categories are shown in parentheses.

1. Masters champions
Seve Ballesteros, Fred Couples (10), Ben Crenshaw, Raymond Floyd, Bernhard Langer, Sandy Lyle, Phil Mickelson (4,10,11,14,15,16,17), Larry Mize, José María Olazábal (10,14,15,17), Mark O'Meara, Gary Player, Vijay Singh (4,10,11,14,15,16,17), Craig Stadler, Tom Watson, Mike Weir (10,11,14,15,17), Tiger Woods (2,3,4,10,12,14,15,16,17), Fuzzy Zoeller
Ian Woosnam withdrew before the tournament due to back problems.
Tommy Aaron, Gay Brewer, Jack Burke Jr., Billy Casper, Charles Coody, Nick Faldo, Doug Ford, Bob Goalby, Jack Nicklaus, and Arnold Palmer did not play. After a few years hiatus, a custom was resurrected when Palmer served as the new "honorary starter" and teed off on the first day at the first hole to kick off the tournament.

2. U.S. Open champions (last five years)
Michael Campbell (15,17), Jim Furyk (11,12,14,15,17), Retief Goosen (10,14,15,17), Geoff Ogilvy (10,11,14,15,16,17)

3. The Open champions (last five years)
Ben Curtis (14), Ernie Els (12,14,15,17), Todd Hamilton

4. PGA champions (last five years)
Rich Beem, Shaun Micheel (13)

5. The Players Championship winners (last three years)
Stephen Ames (10,14,15,17), Fred Funk

Due to rescheduling of the 2007 tournament from March to May (after the Masters), only the 2005 and 2006 champions were invited.

6. U.S. Amateur champion and runner-up
John Kelly (a), Richie Ramsay (a)

7. The Amateur champion
Julien Guerrier (a)

8. U.S. Amateur Public Links champion
Casey Watabu (a)

9. U.S. Mid-Amateur champion
Dave Womack (a)

10. Top 16 players and ties from the 2006 Masters
Ángel Cabrera (15,17), Chad Campbell (14,15,17), Stewart Cink (14,15,17), Tim Clark (14,15,17), Miguel Ángel Jiménez, Billy Mayfair, Arron Oberholser (14,15,17), Rod Pampling (14,15,17), Scott Verplank (14)

11. Top eight players and ties from the 2006 U.S. Open
Kenneth Ferrie, Pádraig Harrington (15,17), Colin Montgomerie (15,17), Nick O'Hern (15,17), Jeff Sluman, Steve Stricker (14,17)

12. Top four players and ties from the 2006 Open Championship
Chris DiMarco (15,17)

13. Top four players and ties from 2006 PGA Championship
Luke Donald (14,15,17), Sergio García (15,17), Adam Scott (14,15,17)

14. Top 40 players from the 2006 PGA Tour money list
Stuart Appleby (15,17), K. J. Choi (15,17), Joe Durant (15,17), Lucas Glover (15,17), J. J. Henry, Tim Herron, Trevor Immelman (15,17), Zach Johnson, Jerry Kelly, Davis Love III (15,17), Troy Matteson, Tom Pernice Jr., Carl Pettersson (15,17), Brett Quigley, Rory Sabbatini (15), Vaughn Taylor, David Toms (15,17), Camilo Villegas, Brett Wetterich (15,17), Dean Wilson

15. Top 50 players from the final 2006 world ranking
Robert Allenby (16,17), Thomas Bjørn, Paul Casey (17), Darren Clarke, Ben Crane, Bradley Dredge, Johan Edfors, Niclas Fasth (17), David Howell (17), Robert Karlsson (17), Shingo Katayama (17), Ian Poulter (17), Jeev Milkha Singh (17), Henrik Stenson (16,17), Lee Westwood, Yang Yong-eun (17)

16. Top 10 players from the 2007 PGA Tour money list on March 26
Aaron Baddeley (17), Mark Calcavecchia, Charles Howell III (17), John Rollins (17)

17. Top 50 players from world ranking published March 26
Bart Bryant, Paul Goydos, Justin Rose

18. Special foreign invitation
Hideto Tanihara

Round summaries

First round
Thursday, April 5, 2007

Billy Mayfair and Ian Poulter were the first competitors to tee off in the 2007 Masters. Both posted scores that were over par. Poulter posted a 75 (+3) and Mayfair a 76 (+4). The course proved to be playing tough, as many big names faltered on the opening day; Ernie Els finished with a 78 (+6), and defending champion Phil Mickelson looked set to get the same score, but two late birdies salvaged a poor round at 76 (+4). World number two Jim Furyk managed a 75 to keep himself in contention. Gary Player, playing in his 50th Masters, could only manage an 83 (+11); two-time winner Seve Ballesteros was at 86 (+14). Tim Clark, the 2006 runner-up, produced a wonderful shot on the 18th hole. At even par, he pulled his second shot to the left of the green and chose to putt. His ball went all the way round the green before it dropped for a birdie and 71. The leaders after the first round were Justin Rose and Brett Wetterich at 69. Rose set a new lowest putts record, needing just twenty. One of the reasons for this was his superb chipping which included a holed bunker shot on the 5th to pick up his second birdie after one at the 3rd. He then crisply rolled home another birdie at 14 to move to three-under par and made a fine save at the last having found a greenside bunker. Wetterich produced five birdies during his round. The chasing pack consisted of David Howell who eagled the 15th to post a two-under 70, and major winner David Toms.  Behind them at 71, in addition to Clark, were Vaughn Taylor, Zach Johnson, Rich Beem, and J. J. Henry.

Second round
Friday, April 6, 2007

Only three were under par at the halfway point of the tournament. Wetterich and Clark held the 36-hole lead at 142 (-2). Clark was the only man in the field to shoot under par in both rounds (71-71). Taylor held solo third place a stroke back at 143. Despite only three being under par, several golfers were within striking distance. Vijay Singh, the 2000 champion, was among a group of four at even par, and Pádraig Harrington was among a group of six at 145 (+1). The cut was at 152 (+8) and among those to miss it were notables Sergio García and Els. Fred Couples, the 1992 champion, parred the final hole to make the cut in his 23rd consecutive appearance to tie Gary Player's Masters record.

Amateurs: Kelly (+10) Ramsay (+12), Guerrier (+20), Watabu (+21), Womack (+21).

Third round
Saturday, April 7, 2007

The third round saw the worst playing conditions in many years at Augusta on an unseasonably cool day with wind gusts reaching . The conditions were clearly a factor as no scores broke 70 for the round. Despite a one-over 73, Stuart Appleby took the 54-hole lead at 218 (+2). Four-time champion Tiger Woods was able to climb the leaderboard into a tie for second with an even par round. Rose shot 75 (+3) to settle into the tie for second with Woods. Retief Goosen was the only player to break par on Saturday with a two-under 70; he made the cut on the number at 152 (+8) on Friday. The final pair both shot in the 80s; Wetterich carded 83 (+11) and Clark an 80 (+8) to fall out of contention. After the third round, fourteen golfers were within four strokes of the lead.

Final round
Sunday, April 8, 2007

Summary
Johnson completed a Cinderella story with a three-under 69 to claim his first major title. He captured the green jacket with three birdies over his final six holes, and became the third Masters champion to win the tournament with a score above par. The others were Sam Snead in 1954 and Jack Burke Jr. in 1956, also at 289 (+1). Johnson matched the round of the day and was able to hold off a group of three, including Woods, that finished two strokes back. Woods lost a major for the first time in which he held the lead at some point in the final round. However, since he was a stroke behind Appleby coming into the day, his 12–0 record when leading or tied at the start of the final round of a major remained intact. Appleby started off with a double bogey and added another at #12; his 75 (+3) led to a tie for seventh. South Africans Goosen and Rory Sabbatini both shot 69 to finish in a tie for second with Woods. Justin Rose was the last player to have a realistic chance of matching Johnson's clubhouse score, getting within 1 stroke at +2 with birdies at 14 and 16.  However he made a double bogey on 17 to fall 3 strokes back into a tie for 5th.  Defending champion Mickelson finished ten strokes back at 299 (+11), tied for 24th.

Final leaderboard

Scorecard

Cumulative tournament scores, relative to par
{|class="wikitable" span = 50 style="font-size:85%;
|-
|style="background: Red;" width=10|
|Eagle
|style="background: Pink;" width=10|
|Birdie
|style="background: PaleGreen;" width=10|
|Bogey
|style="background: Green;" width=10|
|Double bogey
|}
Source:

Par 3 Contest
Mark O'Meara, 1998 champion, won the annual Par 3 contest, held on Wednesday, April 4.

References

External links
Masters.com – past winners
Coverage on the European Tour's official site
Augusta.com – 2007 Masters leaderboard and scorecards

2007
2007 in golf
2007 in American sports
2007 in sports in Georgia (U.S. state)
April 2007 sports events in the United States